Bridgeport International Academy (BIA)  is a private college preparatory school in Bridgeport, Connecticut. The school is located adjacent to the seaside campus of the University of Bridgeport. Students have the opportunity to take college courses and use university facilities.

History

On March 9, 2007, BIA was again granted state approval as a nonpublic school by the State of Connecticut. In addition, the academy has approval from the Department of Homeland Security of the U.S. government to issue I-20 forms in order for international students to obtain F-1 non-immigrant student visas. On March 15, 2007, Bridgeport International Academy was elected to institutional membership and was granted accreditation for ten years by the New England Association of Schools and Colleges.

BIA then moved to the former Seaside Institute at 285 Lafayette Street in 2008 and also developed an English Language Program, taking international students through two levels of English and then mainstreaming them into regular classes by their junior or senior year. International students have already graduated from BIA and are now in colleges and universities in the United States.

Facilities

Bridgeport International Academy is located on 285 Lafayette Street, Bridgeport, Connecticut. All classes and offices are located there, including Intensive English or ELL classrooms, English classroom, science classroom and lab, computer laboratories, assembly room, lunch room, and health center.

The school has two separate dorms, one for boys and one for girls.

Through an arrangement with the University of Bridgeport, BIA students, faculty and administrative staff have access to the following university facilities: The Marina Dining Hall, The Magnus Wahlstrom Library, The Wheeler Recreation Center, The Arnold Bernhard Arts and Humanities Center, and the University Student Center.

BIA Affiliation with News 12 Varsity
The academy is partnered with MSG VARSITY on Cablevision Channel 14 to cover and promote school activities and events (UCCT). MSG Varsity is a 24/7 television network dedicated to high school sports, academics and activities throughout the tri-state area. The students and faculty in schools that are working with this service are given access to curriculum and training in multimedia creation and distribution (Cablevision).

MSG Varsity has provided HD cameras and video editing software to the academy, in addition to hosting videos made by the academy's students on their website. Also, a crew from MSG Varsity occasionally comes to record special events or for interviews. One student, Daniel Hirano, was interviewed about his hobby, origami. The videos made by the students of BIA are available on the MSG Varsity website, or on Cablevision channel 14.

See also
 University of Bridgeport

References

External links
 

Private high schools in Connecticut
Educational institutions established in 1997
Schools in Fairfield County, Connecticut
Education in Bridgeport, Connecticut
1997 establishments in Connecticut